Robin Matthew Schofield (6 November 1939 – 6 January 1990) was a New Zealand first-class cricketer who played for Central Districts from 1960 to 1975.

Robin Schofield began his first-class career in 1959-60 as a bowler of left-arm wrist-spin, when he played three matches and took five wickets. He then disappeared from first-class cricket until he re-emerged in 1964-65 as a wicket-keeper. Against Wellington in the first match of the Plunket Shield season he took seven catches in the first innings and nine in the match, setting new records for New Zealand first-class cricket. 

He kept wicket for Central Districts for most of the next ten years, and made useful runs in the lower order. He also played Hawke Cup cricket for Hawke's Bay from 1960 to 1974, scoring a century when they took the title from Marlborough in 1968.

He was a schoolteacher in Taradale, near Napier. He died in an accident while cutting firewood at his home in Puketapu.

The cricketers Sara McGlashan and Peter McGlashan are his grandchildren.

References

External links

1939 births
1990 deaths
People from Hokitika
New Zealand cricketers
Central Districts cricketers